Cryptoblepharus virgatus, also commonly known as striped snake-eyed skink, cream-striped shinning-skink, wall skink, fence skink or snake-eyed skink is a skink commonly found in southern and eastern Australia. It is an active little lizard, and if threatened will often play dead to confuse the attacker.

Description
It is a relatively small, flat bodied skink of a silver-gray coloring. It has a distinct white stripe running along its body from the eye to the base of its tail. Also sometimes called a snake-eyed skink because it lacks eyelids, instead having a translucent layer of scales covering its eyes similar to that of snakes. The skink has around five supraciliary scales, with 22 rows of scales on the midbody and eight plantar scales that are rounded and pale plantar scales.

Taxonomy
The species was first formally identified by the herpetologist Samuel Garman in 1901 as part of the work Some reptiles and batrachians from Australasia as published in the Bulletin of the Museum of Comparative Zoology, Harvard. The species name is Latin for striped.

Habitat
The range of the skink is in northeastern Queensland and into Papua New Guinea. Its habitats include urban areas, woodlands and grasslands. It will often be seen on vertical surfaces such as trees, fences and walls.

References

Cryptoblepharus
Reptiles described in 1901
Skinks of Australia
Skinks of New Guinea
Taxa named by Samuel Garman